Lawrence Stanley Springer (born January 30, 1947) is a Democratic member of the Washington House of Representatives, representing the 45th district since 2005. He currently serves as the Deputy Majority Leader. Springer was the mayor of Kirkland from 2000 to 2003 and served on the Kirkland City Council from 1994 to 2004.

References

External links

Washington State Legislature - Rep. Larry Springer - official WA House website
Project Vote Smart - Representative Larry Springer (WA) profile
Follow the Money - Lawrence Springer
2006 2004 campaign contributions

Democratic Party members of the Washington House of Representatives
Living people
University of Oregon alumni
Western Washington University alumni
1947 births
21st-century American politicians
People from Snoqualmie, Washington